Leila Rahimi is an American television sports anchor and reporter.

Biography
Rahimi was born and raised in Denton, Texas. After high school, she interned with Dallas Mavericks announcers Wally Lynn and Mike Fisher. In 2002, she graduated magna cum laude from the University of North Texas with a degree in journalism. From 2001 to 2005, she worked as an anchor/reporter with KTCK-AM Sports Radio in Dallas. In 2006, she went to work as a sports anchor/reporter with CBS-affiliate KXII-TV in Sherman, Texas. She held various positions at Fox Sports Southwest in Dallas from 2001 to 2011. In 2007, she accepted a position with NBC-affiliate KXAN-TV in Austin, Texas. In 2012, she moved to San Diego to work for Fox Sports San Diego where she served as the field reporter for the San Diego Padres and produced a weekly program. She then returned to Texas, working at Comcast SportsNet Houston as an anchor, reporter, and sideline reporter for the Houston Astros and the Houston Rockets; while in Houston, she was nominated for several Emmy awards. In 2014 and 2015, Rahimi worked with the MLB Network while in Philadelphia and was an anchor and reporter for Comcast SportsNet Philadelphia.  In October 2015, she was hired as the anchor for NBC Sports Chicago, where she, as of the 2019-20 season, serves as the sideline reporter for Chicago Bulls broadcasts and hosted White Sox pre-game and post-game shows. In August 2020, Rahimi was laid off from NBC Sports Chicago as part of company-wide cutbacks at NBCUniversal due to the ongoing COVID-19 pandemic.

In January 2021 Rahimi was announced as a partner to long-time WSCR host Dan Bernstein on a new mid-day show dubbed "Bernstein and Rahimi".

A year after she was laid off from NBC Sports Chicago, Rahimi returned to the NBCUniversal family in November as a part-time sports anchor and reporter for NBC-owned station WMAQ-TV. She currently rotating their duties alongside Mike Berman and Jeff Blanzy in the station's weeknight newscasts, and currently co-hosting with Berman on the weekly sports news program Sports Sunday, replacing their longtime main sports anchor Siafa Lewis, when he was hired by CBS-owned station KYW-TV as weekday news anchor in the same month. Rahimi was second female co-host of Sports Sunday, behind Paula Faris.

References

Living people
American television news anchors
American women television journalists
University of North Texas alumni
MLB Network personalities
People from Denton, Texas
Bowling broadcasters
21st-century American women
Year of birth missing (living people)